Szmidt and Szmit are Polish-language transliterations of the German surname Schmidt. They may refer to:
Szmidt
John Szmidt, British musician from A Genuine Freakshow band
Józef Szmidt (born 1935), Polish athlete (triple jump world record holder 1960–68) 
Peter Szmidt (born 1961),  Canadian swimmer
Piotr Szmidt, Polish rapper and record producer better known as Ten Typ Mes
Robert J. Szmidt (born 1962), Polish science fiction and fantasy writer, translator and journalist
Tomasz Szmidt (born 1971), Polish field hockey player
Szmit
Artur Szmit, former bass guitarist of Polish streetpunk band The Analogs

Polish-language surnames
German-language surnames